Bucheon Station is a ground level metro station located in Bucheon, South Korea. This station is on Seoul Subway Line 1. It was also once the southern terminus of the Gimpo Line, until its abandonment in 1980.

An E-Mart is located in the station itself.  On the north side of the station there is a plethora of restaurants, bars, and pojang-macha (street food) stalls. To the south of the station there are bus stops for buses departing to Siheung.

References

Seoul Metropolitan Subway stations
Railway stations opened in 1899
Metro stations in Bucheon
1899 establishments in Korea